Joel Melasniemi (born January 19, 1975) is a Finnish musician. He played guitar in the Finnish band Ultra Bra. He is currently the lead composer for Scandinavian Music Group, and also plays guitar and banjo in the band.

References

Living people
1975 births
Finnish guitarists
21st-century guitarists
Place of birth missing (living people)